The following is a list of episodes from the third season of King of the Hill, which originally aired on Fox from September 15, 1998 to May 18, 1999 for 25 episodes.  The Region 1 DVD was released on December 28, 2004. The Region 2 and 4 DVDs were respectively released on August 28 and September 26, 2006.

Production
The showrunners for the season were Greg Daniels and Richard Appel. The show was moved to a Tuesday night time slot this season. This led to a decline in ratings, in part due to competition from WB's hit Buffy the Vampire Slayer (which featured Sarah Michelle Gellar, a guest voice for this season). Fox later moved the show back to its original Sunday night time slot. During this season, the writers started to include darker stories, such as "Pretty, Pretty Dresses", which focused on Bill Dauterive's Christmas suicide attempts.

Episodes

References

1998 American television seasons
1999 American television seasons
King of the Hill 03